Neal's Yard is a small alley in London's Covent Garden between Shorts Gardens and Monmouth Street which opens into a courtyard. It is named after the 17th century developer, Thomas Neale.

In 1976, Michael Palin and Terry Gilliam bought offices at 11 Neal's Yard, and alternative activist and entrepreneur Nicholas Saunders established the bulk Whole Food Warehouse; he had bought 2 Neal's Yard, a derelict warehouse previously used by the former Covent Garden fruit and vegetable market, for £7,000 a few years earlier. From this success, grew other enterprises in other buildings such as Neal's Yard Apothecary (now known as Neal's Yard Remedies), Neal's Yard Bakery, Monmouth Coffee Company and Neal's Yard Dairy,

The area now contains several other health-food cafes and retailers.

Gallery

References

External links
 

Shopping streets in London
Streets in the London Borough of Camden
Covent Garden